The 20th Filipino Academy of Movie Arts and Sciences Awards Night was held in 1972 for the Outstanding Achievements for the year 1971. 

Lilet, a Velarde and Associates Productions  won the most awards with 6 wins including the FAMAS Award for Best Picture and Best Actress for Celia Rodriguez.

Awards

Major Awards
Winners are listed first and highlighted with boldface.

Special Awardees

Dr. Ciriaco Santiago Memorial Award 
Atty. Espiridion Laxa

Gregorio Valdez Memorial Award 
Joseph Estrada

References

External links
FAMAS Awards 

FAMAS Award
FAMAS
FAMAS